Grünau im Almtal is a village in the Austrian state of Upper Austria.

Geography 
Grünau is surrounded by mountains with a central river (Alm) that runs throughout the valley.

Sport 
Grünau also has a passionate connection with their local football team, UFC Drack Bau Grünau. Home games are played at the local football arena, Sportplatz Union Grünau.

References 

Cities and towns in Gmunden District